Malcolm White (born 24 April 1941) is an English former professional footballer who played as a goalkeeper.

Career
Born in Wolverhampton, Staffordshire, White played for Wolverhampton Wanderers, Grimsby Town, Walsall, Lincoln City, Bradford City, Halifax Town, Los Angeles Wolves and Boston United.

References

1941 births
Living people
English footballers
Wolverhampton Wanderers F.C. players
Grimsby Town F.C. players
Walsall F.C. players
Lincoln City F.C. players
Bradford City A.F.C. players
Halifax Town A.F.C. players
Boston United F.C. players
English Football League players
Los Angeles Wolves players
North American Soccer League (1968–1984) players
Association football goalkeepers
English expatriate sportspeople in the United States
Expatriate soccer players in the United States
English expatriate footballers